Jānis Reinis (13 December 1960 – 26 August 2016) was a Latvian actor. In the theatre, he worked for several years in Latvian National Theatre and Dailes Theatre. He also took part in several films.

Filmography

References

External links

Jānis Reinis at the Latvian National Theater homepage

1960 births
2016 deaths
Soviet male stage actors
Soviet male film actors
Latvian male stage actors
Latvian male film actors
People from Obeliai
20th-century Latvian male actors
21st-century Latvian male actors